Ovidiu Marian Popescu (born 27 February 1994) is a Romanian professional footballer who plays as a defensive midfielder or a defender for Liga I club FCSB.

Club career

FCSB
In June 2016, FCSB transferred Popescu for undisclosed fee, with the player penning a five-year deal with a €10 million buyout clause. He made his debut in the Liga I on 12 August against FC Botoșani, a game Steaua went on to win 2–0. On 8 September, also against Botoșani but in the Cupa Ligii, Popescu scored his first goal for the Roș-albaștrii.

He finally scored his first league goal for the club with a free kick in a 2–0 victory over CFR Cluj on 12 March 2017. During early April, following Popescu's good display, it was reported that Celtic and Southampton were interested in signing him.

International career
In June 2015, Popescu was selected in Romania's squad for the 2017 UEFA European Under-21 Championship qualifier against Armenia.

He made his debut for Romania national football team on 25 March 2021 in a World Cup qualifier against North Macedonia.

Career statistics

Club

International

Honours
ACS Poli Timișoara
Liga II: 2014–15

FCSB
Cupa României: 2019–20
Supercupa României runner-up: 2020

References

External links

Living people
1994 births
Sportspeople from Reșița
Romanian footballers
Association football midfielders
Liga I players
Liga II players
FC UTA Arad players
ACS Poli Timișoara players
FC Steaua București players
Romania under-21 international footballers
Romania international footballers